Jamarcus or J'Marcus is a given name. Notable people with the given name include:

Ja'Marcus Bradley (born 1996), American football player
Jamarcus Nelson (born 1992), American football player
JaMarcus Russell (born 1985), American football player
JaMarcus Shephard (born 1983), American football coach
J'Marcus Webb (born 1988), American football player

See also
DeMarcus, given name